Chris Dickerson may refer to:

Chris Dickerson (bodybuilder) (1939–2021), American bodybuilder
Chris Dickerson (baseball) (born 1982), American Major League Baseball outfielder